Elijah, Op. 70, MWV A 25, is an oratorio by Felix Mendelssohn depicting events in the life of the Prophet Elijah as told in the books 1 Kings and 2 Kings of the Old Testament. It premiered on 26 August 1846.

Music and its style
This piece was composed in the spirit of Mendelssohn's Baroque predecessors Bach and Handel, whose music he greatly admired.  In 1829 Mendelssohn had organized the first performance of Bach's St Matthew Passion since the composer's death and was instrumental in bringing this and other Bach works to widespread popularity. By contrast, Handel's oratorios never went out of fashion in England. Mendelssohn prepared a scholarly edition of some of Handel's oratorios for publication in London. Elijah is modelled on the oratorios of these two Baroque masters; however, in its lyricism and use of orchestral and choral colour the style clearly reflects Mendelssohn's own genius as an early Romantic composer.

The work is scored for eight vocal soloists (two each of bass, tenor, alto, soprano), full symphony orchestra including 2 flutes, 2 oboes, 2 clarinets, 2 bassoons, 4 horns, 2 trumpets, 3 trombones, ophicleide, timpani, organ and strings and a large chorus usually singing in four, but occasionally eight parts. The title role was sung at the premiere by the Austrian bass Josef Staudigl.

Mendelssohn had discussed an oratorio based on Elijah in the late 1830s with his friend Karl Klingemann, who had provided him with the libretto for his comic operetta Die Heimkehr aus der Fremde, which resulted in a partial text that Klingemann was unable to finish. In 1845, the Birmingham Festival commissioned an oratorio from Mendelssohn, who worked with Schubring to put the text in final form and in 1845 and 1846 composed his oratorio to the German and English texts in parallel, taking care to change musical phrases to suit the rhythms and stresses of the translation by William Bartholomew, a chemist who was also an experienced amateur poet and composer.

The oratorio was first performed on 26 August 1846 at Birmingham Town Hall in its English version, conducted by the composer, and it was immediately acclaimed a classic of the genre. As The Times critic wrote: 'Never was there a more complete triumph  – never a more thorough and speedy recognition of a great work of art'. Notwithstanding the work's triumph, Mendelssohn revised his oratorio wholesale before another group of performances in London in April 1847  – one (23 April) in the presence of Queen Victoria and Prince Albert. The German version was first performed on the composer's birthday, 3 February 1848, in Leipzig, a few months after Mendelssohn's death, under the baton of the composer Niels Gade.

Biblical narrative

These were doubtless well fitted to the taste of Mendelssohn's time, and a Victorian sentimentality also seems detectable in places.

Among the episodes is the resurrection of a dead youth. A dramatic episode is the contest of the gods, in which Jehovah consumes an offered sacrifice in a column of fire, while a sequence of increasingly frantic prayers by the prophets of the god Baal failed. Part I is concluded by the bringing of rain to parched Israel through Elijah's prayers. Part II depicts the prosecution of Elijah by Queen Jezebel, his retirement to the desert, his vision of God appearing, his return to his work, and his ascension on a fiery chariot into heaven. The work ends with prophecies and praise.

Structure 
The work in two parts opens with a declamation by Elijah, after which the overture is played. The sections are listed in the following table, with the text in both German and English, a biblical source for the passage (the dramatic action highlighted by a background colour), and the voices. The choir is mostly four-part SATB, but up to eight parts. The soloists are Elijah (baritone); soprano (S), singing the Widow, the Youth (sometimes taken by a boy treble) and Angel II; alto (A), singing Angel I and the Queen; and tenor (T), singing the parts of Obadiah and Ahab. The work is often performed with four soloists.

Some movements are simple oratorio forms such as recitative and aria, others explore hybrid combinations, such as recitative with choir, for dramatic effect. The fugal overture leads attacca to the first choral movement. The choir acts as the people ("Das Volk"), but also comments, like the choir in Greek drama. The narrative passages from the books of Kings are highlighted by green background.

Reception
Elijah was popular at its premiere and has been frequently performed, particularly in English-speaking countries, ever since. It is a particular favourite of amateur choral societies. Its melodrama, easy appeal and stirring choruses have provided the basis for countless successful performances. Prince Albert inscribed a libretto for the oratorio Elijah in 1847: "To the noble artist who, surrounded by the Baal-worship of false art, has been able, like a second Elijah, through genius and study, to remain true to the service of true art." A number of critics have treated the work harshly, emphasizing its conventional outlook and undaring musical style. Bernard Shaw wrote:
I sat out the performance on Wednesday to the last note, an act of professional devotion which was no part of my plan for the evening ... You have only to think of Parsifal, of the Ninth Symphony, of Die Zauberflöte, of the inspired moments of Bach and Handel, to see the great gulf that lies between the true religious sentiment and our delight in Mendelssohn's exquisite prettiness.

Its popularity has changed over the years. After Boston's Handel and Haydn Society presented the work for the first time in February 1848, its success resulted in eight more performances that spring. In the mid-1920s, however, H.T. Parker, the city's principal music critic, described how members of the audience gazed upward at a recent performance: "How many of those eyes were there in rapture, or were counting the four dead lights in the central sunburst of the ceiling?.... Elijah is hopelessly, awfully, irremediably mid-Victorian.

Mendelssohn wrote the soprano part in Elijah for the 'Swedish Nightingale', Jenny Lind, although she was unavailable to sing the Birmingham premiere. In her place, the part was created by Maria Caterina Rosalbina Caradori-Allan. Lind was devastated by the composer's premature death in 1847.  She did not feel able to sing the part for a year afterwards. She resumed singing the piece at Exeter Hall in London in late 1848, raising £1,000 to fund a scholarship in his name.  After Arthur Sullivan became the first recipient of the Mendelssohn Scholarship, she encouraged him in his career.

Charles Salaman adapted "He that Shall Endure to the End" from Elijah as a setting for Psalm 93 (Adonai Malakh), sung on most Friday nights at the sabbath-eve service of the London Spanish & Portuguese Jewish community.

References

External links 
 
 Free scores of this work in the Choral Public Domain Library (ChoralWiki)
 Full-text English-language libretto
 Three short musical excerpts from Elijah by a Swiss choir 
 The History of Mendelssohn's Oratorio "Elijah" (1896)
Conference program with abstracts: "Viewing Mendelssohn, Viewing Elijah",

Oratorios
Compositions by Felix Mendelssohn
Elijah
Oratorios based on the Bible
German-language oratorios
Music for orchestra and organ